Omm ol Gharib may refer to:
 Omm ol Gharib-e Bozorg
 Omm ol Gharib-e Kuchek